The San Francisco Call ( Post ) was a newspaper that served San Francisco, California. Because of a succession of mergers with other newspapers, the paper variously came to be called The San Francisco Call & Post, the San Francisco Call-Bulletin, San Francisco News-Call Bulletin, and the News-Call Bulletin before the name was finally retired after the business was purchased by the San Francisco Examiner.

History

Between December 1856 and March 1895 The San Francisco Call was named The Morning Call, but its name was changed when it was purchased by John D. Spreckels. In the period from 1863 to 1864 Mark Twain worked as one of the paper's writers. It was headquartered at Newspaper Row. The Morning Call was reported purchased by Charles M. Shortridge of the San Jose Mercury for $360,000 in January 1895. 

Shortridge became the sole proprietor and editor. He was elected to the California state legislature in 1898 representing the 28th district (San Jose). John McNaught became editor in 1895, when Charles M. Shortridge purchased the paper. He was promoted as general manager of the Call on October 1, 1903, and continued in that position until 1906.

In 1913 M. H. de Young, owner of the San Francisco Chronicle, purchased the paper and sold it to William Randolph Hearst who in 1918 brought in editor Fremont Older, former editor of the San Francisco Evening Bulletin.  In December of that year (1913), Hearst merged The San Francisco Call with the Evening Post and the papers became The San Francisco Call & Post.

Its most famous editor, crusading journalist Fremont Older, agitated for years against civic corruption and colluded with wealthy San Franciscan sugar baron Rudolph Spreckels to bring down the Mayor, Eugene Schmitz and political boss, Abe Ruef.

On 29 August 1929, the newspaper name was changed again to the San Francisco Call-Bulletin, when the San Francisco Call & Post merged with the San Francisco Bulletin. In 1959 the San Francisco Call-Bulletin merged with Scripps-Howard's San Francisco News becoming the News-Call Bulletin.  In 1965, the News-Call Bulletin ceased publication after being purchased by the San Francisco Examiner.

Notable journalists

Bulletin
 William Brown Meloney (1878–1925)
 Bessie Beatty

Call
 Frances Fuller Victor
 Evelyn Wells

Call-Bulletin
 Adeline Daley

See also
Central Tower (San Francisco)
The Montgomery (San Francisco)

References

External links

Image of the San Francisco Call
 
Chronology of San Francisco newspapers mirror from Internet Archive as of 2007-08-07
History of the San Francisco Call from the Library of Congress Chronicling America Project
Browse Issues by Calendar: The Call. San Francisco, CA (1895-1913), at the Library of Congress Chronicling America Project, Images provided by: University of California, Riverside; Riverside, CA
Browse Issues by Calendar: The Morning Call. San Francisco, CA (1878-1895), at the Library of Congress Chronicling America Project, Images provided by: University of California, Riverside; Riverside, CA

Newspapers published in the San Francisco Bay Area
History of the American West
History of California
Defunct newspapers published in California